The 1984 winners of the Torneo di Viareggio (in English, the Viareggio Tournament, officially the Viareggio Cup World Football Tournament Coppa Carnevale), the annual youth football tournament held in Viareggio, Tuscany, are listed below.

Format
The 16 teams are seeded in 4 groups. Each team from a group meets the others in a single tie. The winner of each group progress to the final knockout stage.

Participating teams
Italian teams

  Fiorentina
  Inter Milan
  Lazio
  Milan
  Napoli
  Pisa
  Roma
  Torino

European teams

  Nottingham Forest
  Dukla Praha
  Dinamo Zagreb
  Groningen
  Universitatea Craiova
  Eintracht Frankfurt

American teams
  Santiago
African teams
  Algeria

Group stage

Group A

Group B

Group C

Group D

Knockout stage

Champions

Footnotes

External links
 Official Site (Italian)
 Results on RSSSF.com

1983
1983–84 in Italian football
1983–84 in Yugoslav football
1983–84 in Czechoslovak football
1983–84 in English football
1983–84 in German football
1983–84 in Romanian football
1983–84 in Dutch football
1983–84 in Algerian football
1984 in Chilean football